Alice Ward may refer to:

Alice Ward, a character in the 2010 American film The Fighter
Alice Ward, a character in the British television series Utopia

See also
Alice M. Ward Library, Vermont, U.S.
Mary Alice Ward, Australian teacher and pastoralist